Synodontis leopardus is a species of upside-down catfish native to coastal rivers of Tanzania and Somalia. This species grows to a length of  SL.

References

Further reading

External links 

leopardus
Catfish of Africa
Fish of Tanzania
Fish of Somalia
Fish described in 1896
Taxa named by Georg Johann Pfeffer